Carousel memory is a type of secondary storage for computers, which was created by Swedish computer engineers  and Gunnar Stenudd. It was first shown at an exhibition in Paris in 1958.

Description 
The FACIT ECM 64, manufactured by Swedish company Facit AB, is a prototype of carousel memory. To read a particular roll, the carousel rotates so the desired roll ends up at the bottom. A counterweight sits at the free end of the tape, and facilitates the roll in moving out and down into a mechanism with a read-and-write head. The tape is then rewound. The control system is operated by transistors. Both the carousel and individual spools are replaceable.

The power requirement is 3-phase 380 volts 50 Hz with  when in standby and  when active. Signaling for data uses  -20 V to 0 V 5 µs pulses.

The first delivery of the Facit EDB 3 computer was in 1958 (to ASEA in Västerås) used the carousel memory Facit ECM 64.

See also 
 BESK, Sweden's first electronic computer, also developed by Erik Stemme
 Exatron Stringy Floppy, 1978 endless tape drive
 Karlqvist gap, calculation of magnetic field in ferromagnetic layer
 Rotronics Wafadrive, 1984 endless tape drive
 ZX Microdrive, 1983 endless tape drive

References

Further reading 
 

Information technology in Sweden
Swedish inventions